Niagara Falls is the set of large waterfalls on the Niagara River.

Niagara Falls may also refer to:

Places
Niagara Falls, Ontario, Canada
Niagara Falls (electoral district), an electoral district of Canada
Niagara Falls (provincial electoral district), an electoral district of Ontario, Canada
Niagara Falls, New York, United States
Niagara Falls State Park, in Niagara Falls, New York

Other waterfalls
 Niagara Falls (British Columbia), Canada
Niagara Falls (Réunion)
 Niagara Falls (New Zealand)
 Niagara of the South or Cumberland Falls, a waterfall in Kentucky
 Niagara Falls of Pennsylvania or Bushkill Falls
 Big Niagara Falls and Little Niagara Falls, two waterfalls in Baxter State Park, Maine

Films
Niagara Falls (1926 film), a film produced by George Kirke Spoor
Niagara Falls (1932 film), a film by Fatty Arbuckle
Niagara Falls (1941 film), a film by Gordon Douglas

Music
Niagara Falls (Greg Hawkes album) (1983)
Niagara Falls (Phish album) (2013)
Niagara Falls (EP), by Boxhead Ensemble (1999)
"Niagara Falls" (Chicago song) (1986)
"Niagara Falls" (composition), a 1997 concert band work by Michael Daugherty
"Niagara Falls", a 2020 song by Travis Scott recorded for his unreleased album Utopia

Other uses
"Slowly I Turned" or "Niagara Falls", a comedy skit

See also
Frozen Niagara Falls, a 2015 double album by Prurient
Niagara (disambiguation)
Niagara Falls History Museum
Niagara Falls Museum
Niagara Falls station (disambiguation)